Álvaro Gómez Becerra (26 December 1771, in Cáceres – 
23 January 1855, in Madrid) was a Spanish politician and Prime Minister of Spain in 1843.

Álvaro Gómez Becerra  was a member of the Progressive Party in Spain.
He held important political offices such as Minister of the Justice in 1835-1836 and 1840-1841.  
Between 19 May and 30 July 1843 he was Prime Minister of Spain, until he was replaced by Joaquín María López.

Sources 

1771 births
1855 deaths
Prime Ministers of Spain
Progressive Party (Spain) politicians
Presidents of the Senate of Spain
Presidents of the Congress of Deputies (Spain)